Cenangiumella is a genus of fungi in the family Helotiaceae. This is a monotypic genus, containing the single species Cenangiumella rattanicola.

References

External links
Cenangiumella at Index Fungorum

Helotiaceae
Monotypic Ascomycota genera